Ferdinand Seidl (March 10, 1856December 1, 1942) was a Slovenian naturalist, and geologist.

Seidl is considered the founder of Slovenian geology and geological terminology.

He died in his native Novo Mesto, where a street bears his name (Seidlova ulica).

References

1856 births
1942 deaths
Slovenian geologists
People from Novo Mesto